The 2019 FIBA AfroCan was the inaugural edition of the AfroCan, a men's basketball continental competition of Africa. Only players who play for Africa-based basketball clubs are eligible to participate. The tournament was hosted by Mali, from 19 to 28 July 2019.

DR Congo won the inaugural AfroCan title after defeating Kenya in the final.

Venue

Preliminary round
The draw of the FIBA AfroCan 2019 took place on 13 July in Praia, Cape Verde.

All times are local (UTC±0).

Group A

Group B

Group C

Group D

Final round

Bracket
5–8th place

Final standing

Statistics and awards

Statistical leaders

Players 

Points

Rebounds

Assists

Blocks

Steals

Efficiency

Teams 

Points

Awards
The awards were announced after the final.

References

External links
Official website

2019
2019 in African basketball
2019 in Malian sport
International basketball competitions hosted by Mali
Sport in Bamako